Ilshat Bilalov (born January 15, 1985) is a Russian professional ice hockey defenceman who currently plays for Amur Khabarovsk of the Kontinental Hockey League (KHL).

References

External links

1985 births
Living people
Amur Khabarovsk players
HC Neftekhimik Nizhnekamsk players
Russian ice hockey defencemen
People from Nizhnekamsk
Sportspeople from Tatarstan